Nice was the third album by the Nice; it was titled Everything As Nice As Mother Makes It in the US after Immediate broke their distribution deal with Columbia. Nice had been initially released in the US with a slightly longer version of Rondo 69 not available on the UK or on the independently distributed US versions. The first US version of Nice was briefly reissued in 1973 by Columbia Special Products.

Background
Continuing the Nice's fusion of jazz, blues, and rock, this album consists of studio (1–4) and live (5–6) tracks, the latter having become firm favourites in the band's live performances.

The album reached number 3 in the UK Album charts.

Track listing

Side one 
 "Azrael Revisited" (Keith Emerson, Lee Jackson) – 5:52
 "Hang on to a Dream" (Tim Hardin) – 4:46
 "Diary of an Empty Day" (Music: Edouard Lalo arr. by Emerson, lyrics: Jackson) – 3:54
 "For Example" (Emerson, Jackson) – 8:51

Side two 
 "Rondo '69'" (Brubeck, Emerson, Jackson, Davison) – 7:53 (8:27 on the first US version)
 "She Belongs to Me" (Bob Dylan) – 12:15

Personnel 
The Nice
 Keith Emerson – Hammond organ, pianos
 Lee Jackson – bass guitar, vocals
 Brian Davison – drums, percussion

References

External links 
 

The Nice albums
Live at the Fillmore East albums
1969 live albums
Immediate Records live albums
Albums produced by Lee Jackson (bassist)
Albums produced by Keith Emerson
Albums produced by Brian Davison (drummer)